In the mathematical field of graph theory, an automorphism of a graph is a form of symmetry in which the graph is mapped onto itself while preserving the edge–vertex connectivity.

Formally, an automorphism of a graph  is a permutation  of the vertex set , such that the pair of vertices  form an edge if and only if the pair  also form an edge. Automorphisms may be defined in this way both for directed graphs and for undirected graphs. 
The composition of two automorphisms is another automorphism, and the set of automorphisms of a given graph, under the composition operation, forms a group, the automorphism group of the graph. In the opposite direction, by Frucht's theorem, all groups can be represented as the automorphism group of a connected graph – indeed, of a cubic graph.

Computational complexity
Constructing the automorphism group is at least as difficult (in terms of its computational complexity) as solving the graph isomorphism problem, determining whether two given graphs correspond vertex-for-vertex and edge-for-edge. In fact, just counting the automorphisms is polynomial-time equivalent to graph isomorphism.

The graph automorphism problem is the problem of testing whether a graph has a nontrivial automorphism. It belongs to the class NP of computational complexity. Similar to the graph isomorphism problem, it is unknown whether it has a polynomial time algorithm or it is NP-complete. 
There is a polynomial time algorithm for solving the graph automorphism problem for graphs where vertex degrees are bounded by a constant.
The graph automorphism problem is polynomial-time many-one reducible to the graph isomorphism problem, but the converse reduction is unknown. By contrast, hardness is known when the automorphisms are constrained in a certain fashion; for instance, determining the existence of a fixed-point-free automorphism (an automorphism that fixes no vertex) is NP-complete, and the problem of counting such automorphisms is ♯P-complete.

Algorithms, software and applications
While no worst-case polynomial-time algorithms are known for the general Graph Automorphism problem, finding the automorphism group (and printing out an irredundant set of generators) for many large graphs arising in applications is rather easy. Several open-source software tools are available for this task, including  NAUTY, BLISS and SAUCY. SAUCY and BLISS are particularly efficient for sparse graphs, e.g., SAUCY processes some graphs with millions of vertices in mere seconds. However, BLISS and NAUTY can also produce Canonical Labeling, whereas SAUCY is currently optimized for solving Graph Automorphism. An important observation is that for a graph on  vertices, the automorphism group can be specified by no more than  generators, and the above software packages are guaranteed to satisfy this bound as a side-effect of their algorithms (minimal sets of generators are harder to find and are not particularly useful in practice). However, this has not been established for a fact, as of March 2012.

Practical applications of Graph Automorphism include graph drawing and other visualization tasks, solving structured instances of Boolean Satisfiability arising in the context of Formal verification and Logistics. Molecular symmetry can predict or explain chemical properties.

Symmetry display
Several graph drawing researchers have investigated algorithms for drawing graphs in such a way that the automorphisms of the graph become visible as symmetries of the drawing. This may be done either by using a method that is not designed around symmetries, but that automatically generates symmetric drawings when possible, or by explicitly identifying symmetries and using them to guide vertex placement in the drawing. It is not always possible to display all symmetries of the graph simultaneously, so it may be necessary to choose which symmetries to display and which to leave unvisualized.

Graph families defined by their automorphisms

Several families of graphs are defined by having certain types of automorphisms:
An asymmetric graph is an undirected graph with only the trivial automorphism.
A vertex-transitive graph is an undirected graph in which every vertex may be mapped by an automorphism into any other vertex.
An edge-transitive graph is an undirected graph in which every edge may be mapped by an automorphism into any other edge.
A symmetric graph is a graph such that every pair of adjacent vertices may be mapped by an automorphism into any other pair of adjacent vertices.
A distance-transitive graph is a graph such that every pair of vertices may be mapped by an automorphism into any other pair of vertices that are the same distance apart.
A semi-symmetric graph is a graph that is edge-transitive but not vertex-transitive.
A half-transitive graph is a graph that is vertex-transitive and edge-transitive but not symmetric.
A skew-symmetric graph is a directed graph together with a permutation σ on the vertices that maps edges to edges but reverses the direction of each edge. Additionally, σ is required to be an involution.

Inclusion relationships between these families are indicated by the following table:

See also
 Algebraic graph theory
 Distinguishing coloring

References

External links

Algebraic graph theory

de:Automorphismus#Graphen